Narrowsburg Methodist Church is a historic Methodist church on Lake Street in Narrowsburg, Sullivan County, New York.  It was built in 1856 and is a frame, Greek Revival style meeting house.  The rectangular structure features a pedimented facade and open belfry decorated with finials.  It was moved to its present location in 1879 and modified about 1930.

It was added to the National Register of Historic Places in 2000.

References

Methodist churches in New York (state)
Churches on the National Register of Historic Places in New York (state)
Churches completed in 1856
19th-century Methodist church buildings in the United States
Churches in Sullivan County, New York
National Register of Historic Places in Sullivan County, New York